John de Charneles was a 14th century English knight and administrator who served as Keeper of the Great Wardrobe (1344), lieutenant of the Seneschal of Gascony (1351) and Constable of Bordeaux (1351).

Life
Charneles was the son of William de Charneles of Bedworth and Margaret. He served as Keeper of the Great Wardrobe in 1344. Appointed on 13 September 1350, as Constable of Bordeaux. John was captured by the French in 1351 at Sainte-Foy-la-Grande and spent a period in captivity before being ransomed. He died without issue with his wife Elizabeth surviving him.

Notes

References

Year of birth unknown
Year of death unknown
14th-century English people
Medieval English knights